Joseph, Joe, or Joey Hayes may refer to:

 Joseph Hayes (general) (1835–1912), Union Army brigadier general
 Joseph H. Acklen (1850–1938), U.S. Representative from Louisiana, born Joseph Hayes Acklen
 Joe Black Hayes (1915–2013), American football player and coach
 Joseph Hayes (author) (1918–2006), American author and playwright
 Joseph Hayes (sculptor) (1869-1916) British sculptor killed in WWI
 Joe L. Hayes (born 1930), American businessman, civil engineer and politician
 Joe Hayes (footballer) (1936–1999), association footballer who played in the 1950s and 1960s for Manchester City, Barnsley, and Wigan Athletic
 Joe Hayes (author and storyteller) (born 1945), author and storyteller of American Southwest folklore stories
 Joe Hayes (hurler) (born 1963), hurler of the 1980s and 1990s for Tipperary, and Clonoulty-Rossmore
 Joe L. Hayes Jr. (born 1970), American politician
 Joey Hayes (born 1976), rugby league footballer who played in the 1990s and 2000s for Great Britain, St. Helens RLFC, Salford, and Oldham Roughyeds